Médéric Martin (22 January 1869 – 12 June 1946) was a Canadian politician and long-time Mayor of Montreal.

Background

Born to Salomon Martin, a carpenter and Virginie Lafleur, Martin studied at St. Eustache College and went on to open a cigar store in Montreal's East End and soon became a populist politician, best known for stirring up suspicion against English Montreal residents.

Member of the House of Commons
He served as a Liberal Member of Parliament for Sainte-Marie in the city's east side from 1906 to 1917.

City Councillor
Better known as a city politician, he was elected to the City Council in 1906 and represented the Papineau Ward. He was re-elected in 1908 but was defeated in 1910.  He was elected again in 1912.

Mayor of Montreal
In 1914 Martin was elected Mayor of Montreal.  He was re-elected in 1916, 1918 and 1921, but lost against Charles Duquette in 1924.  He was re-elected again in 1926, but was defeated by bitter rival Camillien Houde in 1928.  His 12 years as mayor of Montreal made him, at the time, the city's longest-serving mayor.

Martin oversaw the city during a period when several other adjacent municipalities were merged, including Notre-Dame-de-Grâce and much of the predominantly French speaking east side. He considered Montreal's new French-demographic dominance to be justification for discontinuing the longstanding tradition of alternating mayors between English and French speakers, a practice that has never returned.

Legislative Councillor
Martin was appointed to the Legislative Council of Quebec in 1919 and represented the district of Alma.

After his death in 1946, he was entombed at the Notre Dame des Neiges Cemetery in Montreal.

References

 Bilan du Siècle - Médéric Martin (1869-1946) Homme politique at bilan.usherbrooke.ca 
 
 

1869 births
1946 deaths
Liberal Party of Canada MPs
Members of the House of Commons of Canada from Quebec
Quebec Liberal Party MLCs
Mayors of Montreal
Burials at Notre Dame des Neiges Cemetery